The 1997 WNBA season was the first season for the New York Liberty.

Offseason

Initial Player Allocation

WNBA Draft

Regular season
The Liberty's and WNBA's first game was played on June 21, 1997, in Los Angeles. Led by head coach Nancy Darsch, the Liberty defeated the Los Angeles Sparks, 67-57. The attendance at the Forum was 14,284. The Liberty began their existence with a three-game road trip, where the Liberty went undefeated. The club came back to New York with a 3-0 record. Their first home game was played in Madison Square Garden. On June 29, 1997, in front of a crowd of 17,780, the Liberty scored their first win at home, defeating Phoenix, 65-57.

Rebecca Lobo ranked fourth in the WNBA with 1.8 blocks per game, fifth in defensive rebounds with 141, seventh with 939 minutes played, and tenth in the WNBA in offensive rebounds with 62.

Season standings

Season Schedule

Player stats
Note: GP= Games played; REB= Rebounds; AST= Assists; STL = Steals; BLK = Blocks; PTS = Points; AVG = Average

Kym Hampton ranked tenth in the WNBA in total rebounds with 163
Kym Hampton ranked tenth in the WNBA in blocks with 19. 
Kym Hampton ranked fifth in the WNBA in Field Goal Percentage (.471)
Rebecca Lobo ranked fourth in the WNBA in blocks with 51. 
Rebecca Lobo ranked fourth in the WNBA in total rebounds with 203.
Rebecca Lobo ranked eighth in the WNBA in minutes per game with 33.5 minutes per game.
Sophia Witherspoon ranked seventh in the WNBA in points with 407 points.
Sophia Witherspoon ranked ninth in the WNBA in field goals with 140.
Sophia Witherspoon ranked seventh in the WNBA in points per game with 14.5
Sophia Witherspoon was tied for tenth in the WNBA in steals with 49. 
Teresa Weatherspoon ranked tenth in the WNBA in minutes per game with 33.0 minutes.

Awards and honors
Rebecca Lobo, Forward, All-WNBA Second Team
Teresa Weatherspoon, Guard, All-WNBA Second Team

Teresa Weatherspoon: Led WNBA, Assists, 172
Teresa Weatherspoon: Led WNBA, Steals, 85
Teresa Weatherspoon: Led WNBA, Assists per game, 6.1 
Teresa Weatherspoon: Led WNBA, Steals per game, 3.0

References

New York Liberty seasons
New York
New York Liberty